The 54th running of the Tour of Flanders cycling race in Belgium was held on Sunday 5 April 1970. Belgian Eric Leman won ahead of Walter Godefroot and Eddy Merckx, winning his first of three in the classic The race started in Ghent and finished in Gentbrugge. 37 out of 173 riders arrived.

Course
On the ascent of the Muur van Geraardsbergen Frenchman Roger Pingeon broke clear from the peloton. Eddy Merckx was the favourite to win the race and counter-attacked with Walter Godefroot and Eric Leman. They caught Pingeon on the Bosberg, the climb that made its first appearance in the Tour of Flanders. Pingeon was distanced in the finale and Merckx suffered a puncture in the ultimate kilometer. Leman beat Godefroot in a highly contested two-man sprint and won the race, Merckx finished third.

Climbs
There were eight categorized climbs:

Results

References

Tour of Flanders
Tour of Flanders
Tour of Flanders
1970 Super Prestige Pernod